Pointer is an unincorporated community in Pulaski County, Kentucky.

History
A post office called Pointer was established in 1891, and remained in operation until 1985. The community was named after Pointer Creek. A variant name was "Hickory Nut".

References

Unincorporated communities in Pulaski County, Kentucky
Unincorporated communities in Kentucky